A. K. Khan Tower is a 47-storey,  skyscraper whose construction in the city of Chittagong, Bangladesh is scheduled to begin in 2015.

Planning

A. K. Khan & Company Ltd proposed the project under the name of "A. K. Khan Tower" in 2012. The project was approved in 2013, with the tower construction site located at Agrabad in Chittagong.

See also
 List of tallest buildings in Chittagong

References

Buildings and structures in Agrabad
Skyscraper office buildings in Bangladesh